Kryovrysi (Greek: Κρυόβρυση meaning "cold spring", before 1928: Βερβενή - Verveni) is a mountain village and a community in the municipal unit of Lasiona, Elis, Greece. The community consists of the villages Kryovrysi and Kalyvia. It is situated in the southwestern foothills of Mount Erymanthos, at 960 m elevation. It is 4 km west of Agrampela, 5 km southeast of Kalentzi, 7 km north of Lampeia and 15 km northeast of Antroni. The source of the river Pineios is near Kryovrysi. Downstream from Kryovrysi, near the river bed of the Pineios, is the cave Drakotrypa (also Diakotrypa).

Population

See also

List of settlements in Elis

References

External links

 Kryovrysi GTP Travel Pages

Populated places in Elis